Mateo Morrison Fortunato (born 14 April 1946) is a Dominican writer, lawyer, poet and essayist. He won the Premio Nacional de Literatura of the Dominican Republic in 2010.

Biography
Morrison is the son of Egbert Morrison, a native of Jamaica, and Efigenia Fortunato. He studied at the Latin American and Caribbean Center for Cultural Development in Venezuela, majoring in Cultural Management. He started the Cesar Vallejo Literary Workshop in the latter part of 1970s and, in 2010, became the twentieth recipient of the Premio Nacional de Literatura, being honored especially for his poetry. He was director of the Departament of Culture of the Universidad Autónoma de Santo Domingo (UASD) and has served as the Sub-Secretary of Culture for the Dominican Republic since his appointment in 2008 by Leonel Fernández.

Selected works
Abril del ’65 : Visión Poética, Comisión Permanente de Efemérides Patrias (2000)  
Pablo Neruda y Su Presencia, Camara Dominicano del Libro (2004)  
Un Silencio que Camina : Novela, Editora Búho (2007)  
Estático en la Memoria y Otros Textos, Santuario (2009)  
Política Cultural, Legislación y Derechos Culturales en República Dominicana, Ediciones de la Secretaría de Estado de Cultura (2009)  
El Abrazo de las Sombras, Santuario (2011)

References

External links

1946 births
Living people
20th-century Dominican Republic poets
Dominican Republic male poets
People from Santo Domingo
21st-century Dominican Republic poets
Dominican Republic people of Cocolo descent